Lyonetia boehmeriella is a moth in the Lyonetiidae family. It is known from Kyushu island of Japan.

The wingspan is 6–7 mm. Adults are on wing from the middle of April to the middle of May, from the end of June to the beginning of July, from the end of July to the beginning of August, at the end of August and at the middle of October. There are several generations per year.

The larvae feed on Boehmeria spicata. They mine the leaves of their host plant. The mine has the form of a blotch mine, usually extending from the apex of the leaf towards the base in an irregular blotch. The spring mine is deep brown, opaque and occupying the apical portion of the leaf, while the autumnal mine is pale green, semi-transparent and sometimes forming at the central portion of the leaf. The blackish grains of frass are scattered in the mine. The larva often migrates from one leaf to another. Full-grown larvae leave the mine and spin a hammock-like cocoon on the lower side of the leaf.

External links
Revisional Studies on the Family Lyonetiidae of Japan (Lepidoptera)

Lyonetiidae
Moths of Japan